Adhinayak is a 2006 Indian Assamese language drama film directed by Jatin Bora. The film is the directorial debut of Jatin Bora who himself plays the protagonist. The film was released on 17 February 2006 simultaneously at Tezpur, Nagaon and Dhemaji.

Synopsis
The story revolves around a mechanic named Raja and his relationships with the other characters.

Cast

Soundtrack

The music of Adhinayak is composed by Zubeen Garg. The Song "Apon Buli Jakei" was later dubbed from Garg's earlier Bengali film Shudhu Tumi in 2004.

See also
Assamese cinema

References

External links 
 

Indian drama films
2006 films
2006 drama films
Films set in Assam
2000s Assamese-language films